Llanmorlais railway station served the village of Llanmorlais, in the historical county of West Glamorgan, Wales, from 1884 to 1957 on the Llanmorlais Branch.

History 
The station was opened on 1 March 1884 by the London and North Western Railway. It closed to passengers on 5 January 1931 and closed to goods in 1957.

References 

Disused railway stations in Swansea
Former London and North Western Railway stations
Railway stations in Great Britain opened in 1884
Railway stations in Great Britain closed in 1931
1884 establishments in Wales
1957 disestablishments in Wales